Roder is a village in Luxembourg.

Roder, Röder or Rőder may also refer to:

Geography
Große Röder, river in Brandenburg and Saxony, Germany
Kleine Röder (Black Elster), river in Brandenburg, Germany
Kleine Röder (Große Röder), river in Saxony, Germany
Schwarze Röder, river in Saxony, Germany

People
Berndt Röder (born 1948), German politician
Dechen Roder (born 1980), Bhutanese filmmaker
Enno Röder (1935–2019), German cross-country skier
Erhard Ernst von Röder (1665-1743), Prussian field marshal
Franz-Josef Röder (1909-1979), German politician
Friedrich Erhard von Röder (1768–1834), Prussian officer during the Napoleonic Wars
Johann Michael Röder (fl. 1708-1746), German organ builder
Klaus Röder (born 1948), German musician
Matthias Röder (born 1972), German canoeist
Mirro Roder (born 1944), Czech-born American football placekicker
Nigel Roder (born 1967), English court jester
Reinhard Roder (born 1941), German football player and manager
Rick Roder, baseball umpire
Vilmos Rőder (1881-1969), Hungarian officer

See also
Arenz, Röder and Dagmar v. Germany, UN Human Rights Committee case
Rode (disambiguation), a surname and placename
Roeder, surname